Haliplus ruficollis is a species of water beetle from the Haliplidae family that can be found everywhere in Europe, the Near East and the East Palaearctic, but is absent in Albania and all European islands except for Corsica.

References

Beetles described in 1774
Taxa named by Charles De Geer
Beetles of Asia
Beetles of Europe
Haliplidae